Radical 184 or radical eat meaning "eat" or "food" is one of the 11 Kangxi radicals (214 radicals in total) composed of 9 strokes.

In the Kangxi Dictionary, there are 403 characters (out of 49,030) to be found under this radical.

 is also the 185th indexing component in the Table of Indexing Chinese Character Components predominantly adopted by Simplified Chinese dictionaries published in mainland China, with the simplified left component form  and its traditional form  listed as its associated indexing components.

Evolution

Derived characters

Variant forms
This radical character has different forms in different languages when used as an individual character and as a component.

This change is applied chiefly to Traditional Chinese publications in mainland China; the left component form  was already replaced by the simplified form  prior to the printing typeface reform.

In principle, these changes apply only to jōyō kanji (more specifically, jōyō kanji before 2010 revision; some characters added in 2010 were not simplified); the traditional form is used for hyōgai kanji.

Literature

External links

Unihan Database - U+98DF

184
185